Polomolok, officially the Municipality of Polomolok (Jawi: ايڠايد نو ڤولومولوق), is a 1st class municipality in the province of South Cotabato, Philippines. As of May 2020, it has a population of 172,605 people making it the most populated municipality in Mindanao.

It is located between General Santos and Tupi. As of 2019, it is the second wealthiest Municipality in Mindanao with PHP 1.77 Billion worth of assets and in 2021, Polomolok is the 2nd Most Competitive Municipality in Mindanao (9th Nationwide). Polomolok also serves as the chief town in the 1st District of South Cotabato.

On March 2, 2020, former South Cotabato First District Representative Shirlyn Bañas-Nograles filed House Bill No. 6432 for the conversion of the Municipality of Polomolok into a component city of South Cotabato.

History
The name Polomolok was derived from the Blaan term flomlok, which means hunting ground. In the early years, the place where the Poblacion is presently situated was known for its abundance of wild life. There were no roads and the lowlanders befriended the Blaan highlanders and utilized them as guides. Aside from a rich hunting ground, Polomolok had so many creeks with free flowing water coming from the hillsides. Those cool and clear flowing water encouraged foreigners to settle in this place. One of them was a Japanese trader Zenjiro Takahashi and his Blaan wife. He began clearing the area and planted agricultural crops. Not long after, some of the Christians came to settle and started to clear the area.

In 1940, the Philippines Commonwealth government embarked on a very bold program of social amelioration. One of the projects was the distribution of lands to interested people who wanted to settle in Mindanao. Settlers were brought by boat to Dadiangas (General Santos) from Luzon and Visayas. On November 2, 1940, Polomolok was officially opened for settlement and known as Polomok Settlement District. Atty. Ernesto Jimenez was appointed as its first overseer. He was responsible for the allocation of farm lots.  Then came the creation of some barrios of the settlers. These were Palkan, Lemblisong, Polo, Polomolok Central (now Poblacion), Polomolok Creek (now Magsaysay), Sulit, Lamcaliaf, Kinilis, Glamang, Bentung, Koronadal Proper, Leve, and Silway. The first settlers, after a crop or two, started to invite their friends and relatives to settle in this place, because the soil was so fertile that any crop can survive due to favorable climate conditions.

The settlement program was interrupted for four years by the Second World War. Don Francisco Natividad was appointed Military Mayor with Datu Badung Nilong as Vice Mayor and Sgt. Nuevarez as Chief of Police. In 1948, Perfecto Balili was designated NLSA Administrator with Rosendo Sarte as Officer-In-Charge. In 1954, the NLSA was abolished in the course of government reorganization. All records of NLSA were taken over by the Board of Liquidators. The Municipality of General Santos (formerly Buayan) was incorporated.

On August 21, 1957, the Municipality of Polomolok was created by virtue of a Presidential Executive Order No. 264 signed by President Carlos P. Garcia. It started functioning as a regular and independent municipality on September 10, 1957, as a 6th class municipality. The local officials were appointed by the President. Its first appointed Mayor was Datu Badong Nilong.

From 1957 to 1963, the progress of this town was still very slow. Fields have always been green, harvest bountiful but farm products had low market value and circulation of cash was rather slow. Then came a breakthrough, when the largest pineapple company, the Dole Philippines Inc., was planted and inaugurated on December 7, 1963.

Cityhood

House Bill No. 6432 was filed by former South Cotabato First District Representative Shirlyn Bañas-Nograles on March 2, 2020 for the conversion of the municipality of Polomolok into a component city in the province of South Cotabato. However, the Bureau of Local Government Finance (BLGF)’s Average Annual Income (AAI) Certification No. 2021-008 indicates that Polomolok still fell short of the required income thus stalling the proposed conversion. A municipality needs P100M as its Annual Average Income (AAI) to qualify for the conversion into a city. Polomolok's AAI was only P76.9 for FY 2018 and 2019. The bill is currently pending with the committee on local government since March 4, 2020.

Geography 
Located at the southern part of South Cotabato, Polomolok is nestled at the base of the prominent Mount Matutum. It is perhaps the provinces most imposing landmark.

Natural hot and cold spring abound at its foot. Natural springs are abundant within this area and provide free flowing water. Two of these springs have developed into natural resorts.

Climate 

Polomolok features a tropical rainforest climate (Af), according to the Köppen-Geiger climate classification, with significant rainfall year-round and constantly hot temperatures. Since this tropical rainforest climate is more subject to the Intertropical Convergence Zone than the trade winds and experiences very few cyclones, it is subequatorial. The city experiences considerable rainfall during the year, even during the driest month. The average annual temperature is 25.7 °C in Polomolok. In a year, the average rainfall is 1410 mm. March is the driest month, and June is the wettest month in the city.

Barangays
Polomolok is politically subdivided into 23 barangays. Barangay Poblacion is also known as Polomolok itself. There are 4 urban barangays and 19 rural barangays.

Demographics

Polomolok has a population of 172,605 people as per census data of 2020, thus making it the most populated municipality (next to Koronadal City) in the province.

Based on its latest population, it is the most populous municipality in Mindanao, the largest municipality in the Soccsksargen Region and 12th most populous municipality in the Philippines. Cebuano is widely spoken and is the native language of majority of the municipality's inhabitants.

Economy 

The Municipality of Polomolok prides its successful implementation of its Revenue Generation Program as an exemplary practice. The purpose of the program is to increase local revenues from collection of real property taxes and other fees and charges; update Municipal Tax Ordinance; Conduct Business Tax Mapping; and system automation. Rank 2nd on the rich municipalities and cities in Mindanao with less percentage of poverty incidence.

Income classification
As of 2019, Polomolok has a total assets of PhP 1,773,573,000 and a total revenue of PhP 577,267,000 as certified by the Commission on Audit. It is a 1st class municipality.

Polomolok is considered as the wealthiest and richest municipality in South Cotabato and the second richest municipality in Mindanao. Also, the town is the 2nd Most Competitive Municipality in Mindanao for the year 2020.

Agriculture

It is splendidly gifted with pineapple products and processing, livestock resources (cattle, swine production, meat packaging) furniture, asparagus and cut flowers, cotton ginnery, corn, vegetable and fruits.

Dole Philippines Incorporated is the largest industrial firm involved in growing, processing and exporting of fresh and canned pineapple.  As of 2004, the area planted to pineapple is 15,507.872 hectares with an average production volume of 31.94 metric tons per hectare.  This industry, which is situated at Barangay Cannery Site, generates about 6,000 jobs at present. It is considered as the biggest taxpayer in the municipality.

Corn is the second most grown crop in the municipality. Data from the Agriculture Office revealed that for the year 2003 there are 3,931 hectares or 13.46% of the total cultivated land agricultural lands were devoted to corn. About 1,236 hectares of which are planted to traditional corn seeds at average production of 3.20 MT/hectare and 2,695 hectares are planted to hybrid corn at average production of 4.0 MT/ hectare. The major producers are Barangay Klinan 6, Glamang, Landan, Silway 8 and Upper Klinan. About 30% of populace adopt corn as their staple food.

Rice is also one of the major crops. 99% of the total population has rice as their staple food. Office of the Agriculturist reported that for the year 2006, 445 hectares were utilized for rice production, of which only 300 hectares are irrigated, 45 are lowland, and 100 are upland. Irrigated areas are planted 2.5 time a year while rainfed and upland are planted only once. "Gintoang Masaganang Ani Program" Program targets for the average production of rice at about 4.5 MT, for irrigated, 3 MT for lowland and 1.5 MT for upland. This target was met by the farmers this year because of rice diseases and pest infestation.

The record of the Department of Agriculture shows that as of 2006, the total area planted with asparagus is 1,435.52 hectares.  Plantations of this crop are in Barangay Sulit, Sumbakil, Crossing Palkan, Bentung, Lapu, Pagalungan, Lumakil, Rubber and Magsaysay.  Farmer growers have access to the export market due to contract agreement with Marsman-Drysdale Agri-Ventures and Tropifresh.  The surplus are sold in the local market and diversifically used as supplements for cattle fattening.

Vegetables grow well in Barangay Palkan, Kinilis, Maligo, Sumbakil and Koronadal Proper where the climate is cool and the soil is fertile. However, the farmers cannot really produce in large volume due to financial constraints and unstable prevailing market prices of vegetables.

Livestock and poultry production has increased tremendously in the past years. This is partly due to the municipality's climate and terrain which is ideal for livestock and poultry production. The land area devoted for agri-livestock production is 80 hectares or 0.27 percent of the total agricultural land.

For the year 2006, the Office of the Municipal Agriculturist reported that there are 322,628 heads of livestocks and poultry raised in the municipality. Poultry has the most number of heads at 271,420 where 3,639 are layers, 17,852 are backyard, and 249,929 are commercial under contract growers scheme with different Agri-business firms such as RFM, Vitarich, and Swift followed by swine with 23,719 heads which 10,970 are backyard and a total of 15,113 are raised commercially, and cattle with 24,491 heads where 2,065 are backyard and a total of 22,426 heads fattened in the cattle farms of Montery and DEALCO.

Supply of livestock in the municipality is insufficient due to shipment of livestock which are raised commercially to other parts of the country leaving the backyard raisers to support the local market. The municipality still depend on supplies coming from other areas in the province.

Healthcare
Among the notable hospitals in Polomolok are Howard Hubbard Memorial Hospital, Heramil Hospital, Bontuyan Medical Hospital, and the Polomolok District Hospital.

Radio Station
Polomolok is now the emerging broadcast hub for South Cotabato as there are radio stations established in the town, reaching as far as Sarangani Province and Cotabato Province. Among those are the following:
 88.3 Radyo ng Masa Polomolok 
 99.5 Bondingan FM Polomolok (Polomolok's first radio station)
 100.7 D' Wonder Feel FM Polomolok (IPHILMA Community Radio)

Education
'College and vocational schools
 Dole Philippines School
 Notre Dame — Siena College of Polomolok
 General Santos Academy
 BEST College of Polomolok
 Schola De San Jose
 Philippine Millennium Colleges
 Polomolok National High School
 Poblacion Polomolok National High School
 St. Therese Blue Collar Institute
 Notre Dame of Dadiangas University - Glamang Campus
San Lorenzo Ruiz Academy

References

External links

 Polomolok Profile at PhilAtlas.com
 Polomolok Profile at the DTI Cities and Municipalities Competitive Index
 [ Philippine Standard Geographic Code]

Municipalities of South Cotabato
Establishments by Philippine executive order